This is a list of Belgian football transfers for the 2014-15 winter transfer window. Only transfers involving a team from the Belgian Pro League are listed.

The winter transfer window opens on 1 January 2015, although a few transfers may take place prior to that date. The window closes at midnight on 2 February 2015 although outgoing transfers might still happen to leagues in which the window is still open. Players without a club may join teams, either during or in between transfer windows.

Sorted by date

December 2014

January 2015

February 2015

Sorted by team

Anderlecht

In:

Out:

Cercle Brugge

In:

Out:

Charleroi

In:

Out:

Club Brugge

In:

Out:

Genk

In:

Out:

Gent

In:

Out:

Kortrijk

In:

Out:

Lierse

In:

Out:

Lokeren

In:

Out:

Mechelen

In:

Out:

Mouscron-Péruwelz

In:

Out:

Oostende

In:

Out:

Standard Liège

In:

Out:

Waasland-Beveren

In:

Out:

Westerlo

In:

Out:

Zulte Waregem

In:

Out:

Footnotes

References

Belgian
Transfers Winter
2014 Winter